Venting may refer to:

Venting (album), a 2005 music album by Five.Bolt.Main
"Venting", a song by Nines from the 2018 Crop Circle (album)
Gas venting in the hydrocarbon and chemical industries
Hydrothermal vent
Venting in Drain-waste-vent system in plumbing
Venting in Permeability (foundry sand)
Venting, in anger, a form of complaining
In science fiction, flushing someone into space without full anti-vacuum protection
The act of using a vent in the online multiplayer game Among Us

See also
Vent (disambiguation)